Botucaraitherium is an extinct genus of prozostrodontian cynodonts from the early Norian Riograndia Assemblage Zone in the Candelária Formation of the Paraná Basin in southeastern Brazil. It is known from a single type species, Botucaraitherium belarminoi. The genus name is derived from the Botucaraí Hill, which dominates the landscape of Candelária, Rio Grande do Sul. The species epithet honors Belarmino Stefanello, a volunteer at the Museu Municipal Aristides Carlos Rodrigues, who found the fossil.

References 

Prehistoric prozostrodonts
Prehistoric cynodont genera
Norian genera
Late Triassic synapsids of South America
Triassic Brazil
Fossils of Brazil
Paraná Basin
Fossil taxa described in 2014